This is a list of regions of California, organized by location.

Northern California

Central California
Central California
Central Coast (North)
Big Sur
Monterey Bay
Salinas Valley
Santa Cruz Mountains
Diablo Range
San Joaquin Valley (North)
Metropolitan Fresno

Great Basin
Great Basin
Eastern Sierra
Owens Valley
Tricorner Region/Surprise Valley
Modoc Plateau
Warner Mountains

North Coast
North Coast
Lost Coast
Emerald Triangle
Klamath Mountains
Mendocino Mountains
Humboldt

Sacramento Valley
Sacramento Valley
Sacramento Metropolitan Area
Yuba-Sutter area
Sutter Buttes

Sacramento-San Joaquin River Delta
Sacramento-San Joaquin River Delta
San Joaquin County

San Francisco Bay Area
San Francisco Bay Area
East Bay
Oakland–Alameda County
Tri-Valley Area
Amador Valley
Livermore Valley
San Ramon Valley
Lamorinda
North Bay
Marin County
West Marin
Ross Valley
Wine Country
Napa Valley
Russian River Valley
Sonoma Valley
Telecom Valley
The Peninsula
City and County of San Francisco
San Mateo County
South Bay
Santa Clara Valley
San Jose–Santa Clara County
Silicon Valley

Sierra Nevada
Sierra Nevada
Gold Country
Lake Tahoe
Yosemite

Shasta Cascade
Shasta Cascade
Mount Shasta
Redding Area
Trinity Alps

Southern California

Central Coast
Central Coast (South) /Tri-Counties
San Luis Obispo Area
Five Cities
Santa Barbara Area
Santa Ynez Valley

Desert Region
Desert Region
Mojave Desert
Death Valley
High Desert
Antelope Valley
Morongo Valley
Victor Valley
Panamint Range
Colorado Desert
Low Desert
Coachella Valley
Imperial Valley
Calexico–Mexicali
Palo Verde Valley
Yuha Desert

Inland Southern California

Inland Empire
Cucamonga Valley
San Jacinto Valley
San Bernardino Valley
San Bernardino
Downtown San Bernardino
Chino Valley
Perris Valley
San Gorgonio Pass
San Bernardino Mountains
San Jacinto Mountains
Temecula Valley
San Joaquin Valley (South)
Kern County
Tehachapi Mountains

South Coast
South Coast
Ventura County
Oxnard Plain
Conejo Valley
Thousand Oaks
East County- Moorpark, Simi Valley
Channel Islands
Greater Los Angeles
Malibu
Los Angeles Basin
Gateway Cities
Los Angeles City
East Los Angeles
Harbor Area
South Los Angeles
Westside
Silicon Beach
Palos Verdes Peninsula
South Bay
Beach Cities
San Gabriel Valley
Crescenta Valley
Peninsular Ranges (North)
San Jacinto Mountains
Santa Rosa Mountains
Pomona Valley
Puente Hills
Santa Clarita Valley
San Gabriel Mountains
San Fernando Valley
Santa Monica Mountains
Hollywood Hills
Orange County Area
Santa Ana-Anaheim-Irvine, CA
Santa Ana
South Coast Metro
Santa Ana Valley
Saddleback Valley
Santa Ana Mountains
San Diego–Tijuana
San Diego metropolitan area
North County
North County Coastal
North County Inland
Temecula Valley
East County
South Bay
Mountain Empire

See also
List of regions of the United States

Regions
List